There are over 20,000 Grade II* listed buildings in England. This page is a list of these buildings in the metropolitan borough of Bradford in West Yorkshire.

List of buildings

|}

See also
 Grade I listed buildings in City of Bradford
 Grade II* listed buildings in West Yorkshire
 Grade II* listed buildings in Leeds
 Grade II* listed buildings in Wakefield
 Grade II* listed buildings in Kirklees
 Grade II* listed buildings in Calderdale

Notes

External links

 
Lists of Grade II* listed buildings in West Yorkshire
Buildings and structures in the City of Bradford
Bradford-related lists